Arieh Warshel (born November 20, 1940) is an Israeli-American biochemist and biophysicist. He is a pioneer in computational studies on functional properties of biological molecules, Distinguished Professor of Chemistry and Biochemistry, and holds the Dana and David Dornsife Chair in Chemistry at the University of Southern California. He received the 2013 Nobel Prize in Chemistry, together with Michael Levitt and Martin Karplus for "the development of multiscale models for complex chemical systems".

Biography
Warshel was born to a Jewish family in 1940 in kibbutz Sde Nahum, Mandatory Palestine. Warshel served in the Israeli Armored Corps. After serving the Israeli Army (final rank Captain), Warshel attended the Technion, Haifa, where he received his BSc degree in chemistry, summa cum laude, in 1966. Subsequently, he earned both MSc and PhD degrees in Chemical Physics (in 1967 and 1969,  respectively), with Shneior Lifson at Weizmann Institute of Science, Israel. After his PhD, he did postdoctoral work at Harvard University until 1972, and from 1972 to 1976 he returned to the Weizmann Institute and worked for the Laboratory of Molecular Biology, Cambridge, England. After being denied tenure by Weizmann Institute in 1976, he joined the faculty of the Department of Chemistry at USC. He was awarded the 2013 Nobel Prize in Chemistry.

As a soldier, he fought in both the 1967 Six-Day War and the 1973 Yom Kippur War, attaining the rank of captain in the IDF.

As part of Shenzhen's 13th Five-Year Plan funding research in emerging technologies and opening "Nobel laureate research labs", in April 2017 he opened the Warshel Institute for Computational Biology at the CUHK Shenzhen campus.

Honors
Warshel is known for his work on computational biochemistry and biophysics, in particular for pioneering computer simulations of the functions of biological systems, and for developing what is known today as Computational Enzymology.
He is a member of many scientific organisations, most importantly:

Elected member of the United States National Academy of Sciences (2009)
Fellow of the Royal Society of Chemistry (2008)
Fellow of the Biophysical Society (2000)
Fellow of the American Association for the Advancement of Science (2012)
Honorary fellow of the Royal Society of Chemistry (2014)
Honorary doctorate at Bar-Ilan University (2014)
Honorary doctorate of the Faculty of Science and Technology at Uppsala University (2015)

Awards
 Annual Award of the International Society of Quantum Biology and Pharmacology (1993)
 Tolman Medal (2003)
 President's award for computational biology from  the ISQBP (2006)
 RSC Soft Matter and Biophysical Chemistry Award (2012)
 Nobel Prize in Chemistry (2013) together with Martin Karplus and Michael Levitt for "the development of multiscale models for complex chemical systems".
 Golden Plate Award of the American Academy of Achievement (2014)
The Founders Award of the Biophysical Society (2014)
The 2013 Israel Chemical Society Gold Medal (2014)

Major research achievements
Arieh Warshel made major contributions in introducing computational methods for structure–function correlation of biological molecules, pioneering and co-pioneering programs, methods and key concepts for detailed computational studies of functional properties of biological molecules using Cartesian-based force field programs, the combined Quantum Chemistry/Molecular mechanics (i.e., QM/MM) method for simulating enzymatic reactions, the first molecular dynamics simulation of a biological process, microscopic electrostatic models for proteins, free energy perturbation in proteins and other key advances. It was for the development of these methods that Warshel shared the 2013 Nobel Prize in Chemistry.

Books
 Arieh Warshel. From Kibbutz Fishponds to The Nobel Prize: Taking Molecular Functions into Cyberspace, World Scientific Publishing, 2021.

See also
List of Israeli Nobel laureates
List of Jewish Nobel laureates
Coarse-grained modeling
Empirical valence bond

References

External links
Faculty profile, USC Dornsife
Warshel research group at the University of Southern California
 

1940 births
Living people
Nobel laureates in Chemistry
American Nobel laureates
Israeli Nobel laureates
American biochemists
American biophysicists
Foreign Members of the Russian Academy of Sciences
Israeli biochemists
Israeli biophysicists
Israeli emigrants to the United States
Israeli Jews
Israeli military personnel
Jewish American scientists
Jewish chemists
Jewish physicists
Jewish military personnel
Members of the United States National Academy of Sciences
Theoretical chemists
University of Southern California faculty
Weizmann Institute of Science alumni
Computational chemists